Sagartiogeton is a genus of sea anemones in the family Sagartiidae.

Species
The following species are recognised:

 Sagartiogeton abyssorum Carlgren, 1942
 Sagartiogeton californicus (Carlgren, 1940)
 Sagartiogeton entellae Schmidt, 1972
 Sagartiogeton flexibilis (Danielssen, 1890)
 Sagartiogeton ingolfi Carlgren, 1928
 Sagartiogeton laceratus (Dalyell, 1848)
 Sagartiogeton robustus Carlgren, 1924
 Sagartiogeton tubicolus (Koren & Danielssen, 1877)
 Sagartiogeton undatus (Müller, 1778)
 Sagartiogeton verrilli Carlgren, 1942
 Sagartiogeton viduatus (Müller, 1776)
The following species are now moved to different genera:
 Sagartiogeton antarcticus Carlgren, 1928 accepted as Kadosactis antarctica (Carlgren, 1928)
 Sagartiogeton praelongus Carlgren, 1928 accepted as Daontesia praelonga (Carlgren, 1928)

References

Sagartiidae
Hexacorallia genera